The Bishop of Ferns is an episcopal title which takes its name after the village of Ferns in County Wexford, Ireland. In the Roman Catholic Church it remains a separate title, but in the Church of Ireland it has been united with other bishoprics.

History
The diocese of Ferns or Loch Garman was one of the twenty-four dioceses established at the Synod of Rathbreasail in 1111. Subsequently, the centre of the diocese was located at Ferns due to the influence of Diarmaid mac Murchadha. It comprised roughly the ancient territory of the Uí Cheinnselaig with the bishop's seat (cathedra) located at Ferns Cathedral. During the later medieval period the church at New Ross enjoyed quasi-cathedral status.

Following the Reformation, there are parallel apostolic successions. In the Church of Ireland, Ferns was united with Leighlin in 1597 to form the bishopric of Ferns and Leighlin.

In the Roman Catholic Church, the bishopric of Ferns continues as a separate title. The current Incumbent is the Most Reverend Gerard Nash, Bishop of the Roman Catholic Diocese of Ferns, who was appointed by the Holy See on 11 June 2021 and was ordained bishop on 5 September 2021.

Pre-Reformation bishops

Post-Reformation bishops

Church of Ireland succession

Roman Catholic succession

Notes
  Alexander Devereux was bishop of both successions.

References

Roman Catholic Diocese of Ferns
Religion in County Wexford
Lists of Irish bishops and archbishops
 Bishop
Bishop of Ferns